Eliot Roy Weintraub (born March 22, 1943) is an American mathematician, economist, and, since 1976, professor of economics at Duke University. He was born in 1943 in New York City.

Career
Weintraub has published numerous articles in professional journals and other edited volumes. His teaching and research have traced the connection between mathematics and economics at technical, methodological or historical, and micro and macro levels. A broad theme of later work has been the transformation of economics from a historical to a mathematical discipline, as in General Equilibrium Analysis (1985), Stabilizing Dynamics:  Constructing Economic Knowledge (1991), How Economics Became a Mathematical Science (2002)., and "Finding Equilibrium: Arrow, Debreu, McKenzie and the Problem of Scientific Credit" co-authored with Till Düppe (2014).  The latter was awarded the 2016 Joseph J. Spengler prize for best book by the history of economics society.

He also wrote for and edited Towards a History of Game Theory (1993) and more recently two historiographic volumes.  His books have been variously translated into Japanese, Chinese, French, Spanish, Hungarian, and Italian.

Currently he is Associate Editor of the journals History of Political Economy and the Economics Bulletin, and Co-Editor of the book series Science and Cultural Theory.

He has held visiting positions at the University of Hawaii, UCLA, the Sapienza University of Rome, the University of Bristol, and the University of Venice. At Duke he was Director of Graduate Studies in the Department of Economics from 1972 to 1983, Chair of that department from 1983 to 1987, Acting Director of the Institute of Statistics and Decision Sciences in 1987, Director of the Center for Social and Historical Studies of Science from 1995–1999, and has twice chaired the Academic Council. From 1993 to 1995, he served as Acting Dean of the Faculty of Arts and Sciences. He has served terms on the Advisory Committee on Appointments, Promotion, and Tenure, the Academics Priorities Committee, the Faculty Compensation Committee, and has chaired the President's Advisory Committee on Resources. He served for many years as a pre-major advisor and a teacher of first-year seminars, and has been Director of the Honors Program for the Department of Economics, and Faculty Fellow in the former Edens Federation for Residential Life.

Weintraub has been one of the few economists awarded a fellowship year (1988–9) by the National Humanities Center.  His subject was "The Creation of Modern Economics: 1935–1955". In 1992 he won the Howard Johnson Foundation Distinguished Undergraduate Teaching Award. He was president of the History of Economics Society in 2003–2004 and was honored  by the Society as a Distinguished Fellow in 2011.

A native of the Philadelphia area, Weintraub received an A.B. degree (1964, mathematics) from Swarthmore College and M.S. and Ph.D. degrees (1967 and 1969, applied mathematics) from the University of Pennsylvania. His Ph.D. thesis advisors were Lawrence Klein and Herbert Wilf.

He joined the Duke University faculty in 1970 following a first academic position at Rutgers University. He lives with his family in Durham, North Carolina.

E. Roy Weintraub is the son of the economist Sidney Weintraub.

Notes

External links
 Academic career
 Publications of E. Roy Weintraub
 Curriculum Vitae: E. Roy Weintraub
  
 

Swarthmore College alumni
Living people
Duke University faculty
Economists from New York (state)
20th-century American mathematicians
21st-century American mathematicians
Historians of economic thought
Microeconomists
University of Pennsylvania alumni
1943 births
21st-century American economists